Alexander Harper  (1818–1887) was Dean of Aberdeen and Orkney from 1886  to 1887.

He was educated at the University of Aberdeen and ordained in 1842. After a curacy at Pittenweem  he was the incumbent at Inverurie until his appointment as Dean.

He died in March 1887.

Notes

1818 births
1887 deaths
Alumni of the University of Aberdeen

Deans of Aberdeen and Orkney